The Water Lily is a 1919 silent film drama directed by George Ridgwell and starring Alice Mann.

Prints survive in the Library of Congress collection and the BFI National Archive.

Cast
Alice Mann - Genevieve Conners
Emil De Varney - Jim Conners
Philip Yale Drew - Dick Carlisle
Francis Mann - Evelyn Carlisle
Donald Hall - Willard Carlisle
Eloise Hampton - Mrs. Lawson
Charles A. Robins - Biff Dunton
Edgar Wedd - Dwight Lawson
Leatrice Joy - ?

References

External links
 The Water Lily at IMDb.com

1919 films
American silent feature films
Triangle Film Corporation films
Films directed by George Ridgwell
American black-and-white films
Silent American drama films
1919 drama films
Films with screenplays by Lillian Case Russell
1910s American films